

A meander or meandros is a decorative border constructed from a continuous line, shaped into a repeated motif. Among some Italians, these patterns are known as "Greek Lines". Such a design also may be called the Greek fret or Greek key design, although these terms are modern designations even though the decorative motif appears thousands of years before that culture, thousands of miles away from Greece, and among cultures that are continents away from it. Usually the term is used for motifs with straight lines and right angles and the many versions with rounded shapes are called running scrolls or, following the etymological origin of the term, may be identified as water wave motifs.

On one hand, the name "meander" recalls the twisting and turning path of the Maeander River in Asia Minor (present day Turkey) that is typical of river pathways. On another hand, as Karl Kerenyi pointed out, "the meander is the figure of a labyrinth in linear form".

Meanders are common decorative elements in Greek and Roman art. In ancient Greece they appear in many architectural friezes, and in bands on the pottery of ancient Greece from the Geometric Period onward. The design is common to the present-day in classicizing architecture, and is adopted frequently as a decorative motif for borders for many modern printed materials.

The meander is a fundamental design motif in regions far from a Hellenic orbit: labyrinthine meanders ("thunder" pattern ) appear in bands and as infill on Shang bronzes (c. 1600 BC - c. 1045 BC), and many traditional buildings in and around China still bear geometric designs almost identical to meanders. Although space-filling curves have a long history in China in motifs more than 2,000 years earlier, extending back to Zhukaigou Culture (c. 2000 BC – c. 1400 BC) and Xiajiadian Culture (c. 2200 BC –1600 BC and c. c. 1000 BC -600 BC), frequently there is speculation that meanders of Greek origin may have come to China during the time of the Han Dynasty (c. 202 BC) by way of trade with the Greco-Bactrian Kingdom. A meander motif also appears in prehistoric Mayan design motifs in the western hemisphere, centuries before any European contacts.

Meanders and their generalizations are used with increasing frequency in various domains of contemporary art. The painter Yang Liu, for example, has incorporated smooth versions of the traditional Greek Key (also called Sona drawing, Sand drawing, and Kolam) in many of her paintings.

Gallery

See also 
 Mezine
 Vitruvian scroll

Citations

External links 

 Illustrated Architecture Dictionary: "Fret"—a short description, with a list of links to photographs of meander designs in art and architecture

Greek culture
Ornaments
Visual motifs